Loxostege naranjalis is a moth in the family Crambidae. It was described by Schaus in 1920. It is found in Brazil (São Paulo).

The wingspan is about 23 mm. The fore- and hindwings are orange with black margins.

References

Moths described in 1920
Pyraustinae